The 1972 All-Big Eight Conference football team consists of American football players chosen by various organizations for All-Big Eight Conference teams for the 1972 NCAA University Division football season.  The selectors for the 1972 season included the Associated Press (AP).

Offensive selections

Tight ends
 Keith Krepfle, Iowa State (AP)

Split end
 Johnny Rodgers, Nebraska (AP)

Offensive tackles
 Daryl White, Nebraska (AP)
 Dean Unruh, Oklahoma (AP)

Offensive guards
 Ken Jones, Oklahoma (AP)
 Geary Murdock, Iowa State (AP)

Centers
 Tom Brahaney, Oklahoma (AP)

Quarterbacks
 George Amundson, Iowa State (AP)

Halfbacks
 Greg Pruitt, Oklahoma (AP)
 Charlie Davis, Colorado (AP)

Fullbacks
 Leon Crosswhite, Oklahoma (AP)

Defensive selections

Defensive ends
 Willie Harper, Nebraska (AP)
 Mervin Krakau, Iowa State (AP)

Defensive tackles
 Derland Moore, Oklahoma (AP)
 Bud Magram, Colorado (AP)

Middle guards
 Rich Glover, Nebraska (AP)

Linebackers
 Eddie Sheats, Kansas (AP)
 Rod Shoate, Oklahoma (AP)
 Cleveland Vann, Oklahoma State (AP)]

Defensive backs
 Cullen Bryant, Colorado (AP)
 Joe Blahak, Nebraska (AP)
 John Stearns, Colorado (AP)

Key

AP = Associated Press

See also
 1972 College Football All-America Team

References

All-Big Seven Conference football team
All-Big Eight Conference football teams